Herentals is a city in the province of Antwerp. The municipality comprises the city of Herentals proper and the towns of Morkhoven and Noorderwijk. In 2022, Herentals had a total population of 28.455. Saint Waltrude is the patron saint of the city.

Highlights
Herentals has some outstanding historical buildings, including the church and town hall; the town hall and its belfry is listed as one of the Belfries of Belgium and France, a UNESCO World Heritage Site. The old city gates, the Bovenpoort (Northern gate) and Zandpoort (Western gate) are still standing, while the Nederpoort and Koepoort were torn down a long time ago.

The Hidrodoe science museum is located in Herentals.  There is also a large chocolate factory located in Herentals.

Herentals is a centre of commerce in the region, although the cities of Geel and Mol are quite popular as well.

Herentals is twinned with IJsselstein, Netherlands. The inhabitants of the Campine region have common sobriquets that are particular to their towns; people from Herentals are referred to by the colloquialisms "Klokkenververs" (meaning "bell painters") and "Peestekers", which comes from the old story about the farmers of the town using carrots as a lock on the "Zandpoort", one of the great city gates in that time.

People from Herentals 
 Nicolaes Francken, painter, founder of the Francken painting dynasty (1520–1596)
 Hendrik de Moy, father of Isabella Brant (1534–1610)
 Hieronymus Francken I, painter (c. 1540–1610)
 Frans Francken the Elder, painter (1542–1616)
 Ambrosius Francken I, painter (1544–1618)
 Charles-Auguste Fraikin, sculptor (1817–1893)
 Stefaan Vaes, mathematician (b. 1976)
 Rik Van Looy, professional cyclist (b. 1933)
 Wout van Aert, professional cyclist (b. 1994)

Gallery

References

External links

  
Local radio station with local news - Only available in Dutch
Start Page - Only available in Dutch
Toeristentoren Herentals - The tourist tower of Herentals

Municipalities of Antwerp Province
Populated places in Antwerp Province